The Brindley Water Mill is a water mill in the town of Leek, Staffordshire, England.

The current structure was built on the site of previous corn-grinding mills in 1752 by James Brindley. Owned now by the Brindley Mill Preservation Trust, it has been restored and is now maintained and operated as a working museum. The site also includes a small museum dedicated to Brindley's life and achievements.

The mill is a Scheduled Monument and a Grade II Listed Building.

See also
Listed buildings in Leek, Staffordshire

References

External links
Brindleys Mill web site

Leek, Staffordshire
Buildings and structures in Leek
Biographical museums in Staffordshire
Mill museums in England
Watermills in Staffordshire
Tourist attractions of the Peak District